Crocodilia is an order of mostly large, predatory, semiaquatic reptiles, which includes true crocodiles, the alligators and caimans, and the gharial and false gharial. A member of this order is called a crocodilian, or colloquially a crocodile.

The 9 genera and 28 species of Crocodilia are split into 3 subfamilies: Alligatoridae, alligators and caimans; Crocodylidae, true crocodiles; and Gavialidae, the gharial and false gharial.

Conventions

Conservation status codes listed follow the International Union for Conservation of Nature (IUCN) Red List of Threatened Species. Range maps are provided wherever possible; if a range map is not available, a description of the crocodilian's range is provided. Ranges are based on the IUCN red list for that species unless otherwise noted. All extinct species or subspecies listed alongside extant species went extinct after 1500 CE, and are indicated by a dagger symbol "". Population figures are rounded to the nearest hundred.

Classification
The order Crocodilia consists of 28 extant species belonging to 9 genera. This does not include hybrid species or extinct prehistoric species. Modern molecular studies indicate that the 9 genera can be grouped into 3 families.

Family Alligatoridae (Alligators and caimans)
Genus Alligator: two species
Genus Caiman: three species
Genus Melanosuchus: one species
Genus Paleosuchus: two species
Family Crocodylidae (True crocodiles)
Genus Crocodylus: fourteen species
Genus Mecistops: two species
Genus Osteolaemus: two species
Family Gavialidae (Gharial and false gharial)
Genus Gavialis: one species
Genus Tomistoma: one species

Crocodilians

Family Alligatoridae

The extant Alligatoridae can be recognised by the broad snout, in which the fourth tooth of the lower jaw cannot be seen when the mouth is closed.

Family Crocodylidae

The extant Crocodylidae have a variety of snout shapes, but can be recognised because the fourth tooth of the lower jaw is visible when the mouth is closed.

Family Gavialidae

Gavialidae can be recognised by the long narrow snout, with an enlarged boss at the tip.

References

Crocodilians
Crocodilia